This article chronicles the complete oeuvre of German composer and multi-instrumentalist Peter Frohmader, from his first studio recordings published in 1979 to his death in 2022.   It also includes his work under his Nekropolis moniker as well as his collaborative efforts with other musicians.

As a solo artist

Studio albums

Collaborative albums

Live albums

EPs

Compilation albums

As Nekropolis

Studio albums

Live albums

Compilation albums

References
General

 

Notes

External links
Official website
Peter Frohmader at Discogs
Nekropolis at Discogs

Discographies of German artists
Electronic music discographies